Asier Gómez Etxeandía (born 27 June 1975) is a Spanish film actor and singer, whose career includes television, theater and film performances. He is best known for his character as Raúl de la Riva in Velvet and Velvet Colección and for Pain and Glory (2019), for which he was nominated for Goya Award for Best Supporting Actor.

Biography 
Asier Etxeandía studied acting at a Biscayan school, of which he only keeps fond memories of two teachers, Eguzki Zubia and Juan Carlos Garaizabal. He recently commented on its beginnings, noting that "when you are 19 years old, you trust your teachers to the end and sometimes they are not qualified, but in need of your admiration. I believed in them and they almost drove me crazy. They play with personal things, it is dangerous. I learned a lot about what not to do, how not to behave in this profession. The actor complained about the teachers who criticized the students who appeared on TV. He remembers a teacher who cut a boy's hair because she did not like his performance. "They had our brains so drained that we were delighted with that wonderful ritual," he sentenced.

Asier Etxeandia left the Basque Country when he settled in Madrid at the age of twenty. In the capital he came to work as a manager of a sex shop while he was studying acting. He went to the program Uno para todos, (Telecinco) in 1995, presented by Goyo González, as a contestant. The Globomedia production company hired him during the first season of One Step Ahead, where he played Beni, a homosexual who entered an arts academy with the hope of becoming an actor. Asier left the series because he feared possible typecasting. In spite of everything, he recognized that his work there opened doors for him and he met his first friends in the capital, including Natalia Millán .

Natalia Millán thought of him to star in the musical Cabaret offering him the role of Master of Ceremonies, the one in charge of commenting ironically on the events that take place in Germany in the 1930s . Manuel Bandera and Emilio Alonso León also worked on this montage . During the performance, Asier brought out members of the audience chosen at random, whom he put in trouble on stage. In order to carry out his work, Asier moved away from the interpretation that Joel Gray carried out in the film to be able to make his own creation, without thereby giving up the playful, ill-intentioned and captivating character of the character.

He was cast in Pedro Almodóvar's Broken Embraces, playing a small role as a blind waiter, which was not included in the final cut, but whose scene is part of the additional content of the film on DVD.

Personal life
Asier is openly gay.

Filmography

Films
 La mirada violeta, as Sergio. Dir. Nacho Pérez de la Paz y Jesús Ruiz (2004)
 El próximo Oriente, as Abel. Dir. Fernando Colomo (2006)
 Café solo o con ellas, as Javi. Dir. Álvaro Díaz Lorenzo (2006)
 Las 13 rosas, as Enrique. Dir. Emilio Martínez Lázaro (2007)
 7 minutos, as Vicente. Dir. Daniela Fejerman (2008)
 Mentiras y gordas, as Cristo. Dir. Alfonso Albacete (2009)
 King Conqueror, as Pascual Muñoz. Dir. José Antonio Escrivá, Félix Miguel y Pepón Sigler (2009)
 El Capitán Trueno y el Santo Grial, as Hassan. Dir. Antonio Hernández (2011)
 Los días no vividos, as Jaime. Dir. Alfonso Cortés-Cavanillas (2012)
 Musarañas, script. Dir. Juanfer Andrés y Esteban Roel (2014)
 Ma ma, script. Dir. Julio Medem (2014)
 La novia, as the boyfriend. Dir. Paula Ortiz (2015)
 La puerta abierta, as Lupita. Dir. Marina Seresesky (2015)
 Sordo, as Anselmo Rojas. Dir. Alfonso Cortés-Cavanillas (2019)
 Dolor y gloria, as Alberto Crespo. Dir. Pedro Almodóvar (2019)
Nadie muere en Ambrosia as Barlovento. Dir. Hector Valdez (2020)
Las Mil vidas por anunciar. Mariana Serensky (2020)

Short films 
 ¡After!, as Koldo. Dir. Oskar Bilbao (1996)
 Dame otro final, as a stoner. Dir. Nerea Castro (2000)
 Vértices, as Mario. Dir. Juanan Martínez (2004)
 Unione Europea, as Tomás. Dir. Andrés M. Koppel (2007)
 Final, reparto. Dir. Hugo Martín Cuervo (2007)
 Together, as a man. Dir. Gigi Romero (2009)
 Supercool, as uncredited choreographer. Dir. Hugo Silva (2016)
 Por siempre jamón, script. Dir. Ruth Díaz (2014)
 El pelotari y la fallera, as Asier.

Television

Theatre 
 Cabaret (2003-2005)
 El infierno (2005)
 La divina comedia, as Dante Alighieri (2005)
 El sueño de una noche de verano, as Teseo y Oberón. Dir. Tamzin Townsend (2006-2007)
 Barroco, as Valmont (2007)
 Los lunes pueden esperar (2008)
 Hamlet (2009)
 Medea (2009)
 Homero, La Iliada, lectura dramatizada. Dir. Andrea D'Odorico (2010)
 La avería (2011)
 La chunga. Dir. Joan Ollé (2013)
 El intérprete (2013)

Discography 
 Musical Cabaret, B.S.O. (2003)
 Un rayo de luz, tema: But the world goes round (2006)
 Obra de teatro El sueño de una noche de verano, temas: Canción de Oberón y Lágrimas de Rocío (2007)
 Película Las 13 rosas, tema: J'attendrai (2007)
 Obra de teatro Barroco, B.S.O. (2007)
 Obra de teatro Hamlet, B.S.O. (2009)
 X1FIN: Juntos por el Sahara, tema: Sympathy for the devil, dúo con Pastora (2009)
 El paso trascendental del vodevil a la astracanada, tema: ¿Por qué a mí me cuesta tanto?, dúo con Fangoria (2010)
 Obra de teatro Algo de ruido hace, B.S.O. (2011)
 Colaboración en la canción Tercer Mundo del disco Los Viajes Inmóviles de Nach (2014)
 Redención, primera canción de Mastodonte, dúo que forma junto al músico italiano Enrico Barbaro (2018)
 Trilogía "Anatomía de un Éxodo", formada por las canciones Malenka, Glaciar y Este Amor.
Disco "Mastodonte" compuesto por Mastodonte, grupo formado por Asier Etxeandía y Enrico Barbaro.
"Simplemente Perfecto" canción principal de la BSO de la película "Sordo".

Awards and nominations

Latine Grammy Awards

Goya Awards

Platino Awards

Fotogramas de Plata

Actors and Actresses Union Awards

Max Awards

Ercilla Awards

Málaga Spanish Film Festival

References

External links 
 Entrevista "Jugar a Ser" en Pastiche

1975 births
Living people
People from Bilbao
Spanish male film actors
Spanish male television actors
Spanish male stage actors
21st-century Spanish male actors
21st-century Spanish male singers
Male actors from the Basque Country (autonomous community)
Spanish gay actors
Spanish gay musicians
Spanish LGBT singers
Gay singers
20th-century Spanish LGBT people
21st-century Spanish LGBT people